This is a list of notable events in music that took place in the year 1941.

Specific locations
1941 in British music
1941 in Norwegian music

Specific genres
1941 in country music
1941 in jazz

Events
January 5 – Ernesto Bonino makes his début on Italian radio.
January 15 – Olivier Messiaen's Quatuor pour la fin du temps is premiered by the composer and fellow prisoners-of-war in Stalag VIII-A in Silesia.
January 20 – Béla Bartók's String Quartet No. 6 is premièred in New York City.
May – Woody Guthrie writes and records "Roll On, Columbia, Roll On" and "Grand Coulee Dam" among other folk songs in Portland, Oregon on a commission from the Bonneville Power Administration; these are released as Columbia River Collection.
May 10 – London's Queen's Hall, venue for The Proms, is bombed by the Luftwaffe. The concert series relocates to the Royal Albert Hall.
August 18 – In a brutal police operation in Nazi Germany, over 300 Swing Kids are arrested, marking the end of tolerance to swing music.
date unknown
Alan Lomax (working for the Library of Congress) discovers Muddy Waters and Son House, among others
Les Paul almost electrocutes himself while attempting to build the first solid-body electric guitar.
Enrico Gentile leaves Quartetto Ritmo. Felice Chiusano replaces him and the group is renamed Quartetto Cetra.
Dutch Leschan sisters of Trio Lescano become Italian citizens.
The National Negro Opera Company is launched in Pittsburgh, USA.
Virgil Thomson's Four Saints in Three Acts is presented at Town Hall in New York City.

Albums released
Songs for John Doe – The Almanac Singers
Okeh Presents the Wayfaring Stranger – Burl Ives
Small Fry – Bing Crosby
Hawaii Calls – Bing Crosby, Frances Langford, Harry Owens
Crosbyana – Bing Crosby
Four Star Favorites – Artie Shaw

Top Popular Recordings 1941

For each Year in Music (beginning 1940) and Year in Country Music (beginning 1939), a comprehensive Year End Top Records section can be found at mid-page (popular), and on the Country page. These charts are meant to replace the charts Billboard prints at the end of each year, because they are better. Keep reading.

The charts are compiled from data published by Billboard magazine, using their formulas, with slight modifications. Most important, there are no songs missing or truncated by Billboard's holiday deadline. Each year, records included enter the charts between the prior November and early December. Each week, fifteen points are awarded to the number one record, then nine points for number two, eight points for number three, and so on. This system rewards songs that reach the highest positions, as well as those that had the longest chart runs. This is our adjustment to Mr. Whitburn's formula, which places no. 1 records on top, then no 2 and so on, ordered by weeks at that position. This allows a record with 4 weeks at no. 1 that only lasted 6 weeks to be rated very high. Here, the total points of a song's complete chart run determines its position. Our chart has more songs, more weeks and may look nothing like Billboard's, but it comes from the exact same surveys. 

Before the Hot100 was implemented in 1958, Billboard magazine measured a record's performance with three charts, 'Best-Selling Popular Retail Records', 'Records Most-Played On the Air' or 'Records Most Played By Disk Jockeys' and 'Most-Played Juke Box Records'. As Billboard did starting in the 1940s, the three totals for each song are  combined, with that number determining the final year-end rank. For example, 1944's "A Hot Time in the Town of Berlin" by Bing and the Andrews Sisters finished at no. 19, despite six weeks at no. 1 on the 'Most-Played Juke Box Records'(JB) chart. It scored 126 points, to go with its Best-Selling chart (BS) total of 0. Martha Tilton's version of "I'll Walk Alone" peaked at no. 4 on the Juke Box chart, which only totalled 65 points, but her BS total was also 65, for a final total of 130, ranking no. 18. Examples like this can be found in "The Billboard" magazine up to 1958. By the way, the 'Records Most-Played On the Air' chart didn't begin until January 1945, which is why we only had two sub-totals.

Our rankings are based on Billboard data, but we also present info on recording and release dates, global sales totals, RIAA and BPI certifications and other awards. Rankings from other genres like 'Hot R&B/Hip-Hop Songs' or 'Most Played Juke Box Race Records', Country charts including 'Most Played Juke Box Folk (Hillbilly) Records', 'Cashbox magazine', and other sources are presented if they exist. We supplement our info with reliable data from the "Discography of American Historical Recordings" website, Joel Whitburn's Pop Memories 1890-1954 and other sources as specified. 
The following songs appeared in The Billboard's 'Best Selling Retail Records' chart during 1941. 

Additional recordings of historical interest, and songs that crossed over from Hillbilly (Country) and Race (R&B):

Published popular music
 "All That Meat and No Potatoes" words and music: Fats Waller & Ed Kirkeby
 "The Anniversary Waltz" w. Al Dubin m. Dave Franklin
 "Apollo Jump" m. Ernest Puree, Prince Robinson & Lucius "Lucky" Millinder
 "Arthur Murray Taught Me Dancing In A Hurry" w. Johnny Mercer m. Victor Schertzinger
 "Baby Mine" w. Ned Washington m. Frank Churchill nominated for Oscar, from the animated feature Dumbo
 "Be Honest With Me" w.m. Fred Rose & Gene Autry
 "Blue Champagne" w.m. Jimmy Eaton, Grady Watts & Frank Ryerson
 "Blues in the Night" w. Johnny Mercer m. Harold Arlen
 "Boa Noite" w. Mack Gordon m. Harry Warren
 "Boogie Woogie Bugle Boy" w.m. Don Raye & Hughie Prince
 "Botch-A-Me" w. (Eng) Eddie Stanley (Ital) R. Morbelli & L. Astore m. R. Morbelli & L. Astore
 "Casey Junior" w. Ned Washington m. Frank Churchill from the animated feature Dumbo
 "Chattanooga Choo Choo" w. Mack Gordon m. Harry Warren
 "Cherry" w.m. Charles N. Daniels
 "Chica Chica Boom Chic" w. Mack Gordon m. Harry Warren
 "Could You Please Oblige Us with a Bren Gun?" w.m. Noël Coward
 "Daddy" w.m. Bobby Troup
 "Deep in the Heart of Texas" w. June Hershey m. Don Swander
 "Down Forget-Me-Not Lane" w.m. Horatio Nicholls, Charlie Chester & Reg Morgan
 "Elmer's Tune" w.m. Elmer Albrecht, Sammy Gallop & Dick Jurgens
 "Everything Happens To Me" w. Tom Adair m. Matt Dennis
 "Five Guys Named Moe" w. Larry Wynn m. Jerry Bresler
 "God Bless The Child" w.m. Arthur Herzog Jr & Billie Holiday
 "Goodbye Mama, I'm Off To Yokohama" w.m. J. Fred Coots
 "He Wears a Pair of Silver Wings" w. Eric Maschwitz m. Michael Carr
 "Hey Little Hen" w.m. Ralph Butler & Noel Gay
 "How About You?" w. Ralph Freed m. Burton Lane
 "Humpty Dumpty Heart" w. Johnny Burke m. Jimmy Van Heusen
 "The Hut-Sut Song" w.m. Leo V. Killion, Ted McMichael & Jack Owens, The Cruising Crooner
 "I Could Write a Book" w. Lorenz Hart m. Richard Rodgers. Introduced by Gene Kelly and Leila Ernst in the musical Pal Joey. Performed in the 1953 film version by Frank Sinatra.
 "I Don't Want To Set The World On Fire" w.m. Eddie Seiler, Sol Marcus, Bennie Benjamin & Eddie Durham
 "I Dreamt I Dwelt in Harlem" w. Buddy Feyne m. Jerry Gray, Leonard Ware & Ben Smith
 "I Don't Want To Walk Without You" w. Frank Loesser m. Jule Styne
 "I Got It Bad (And That Ain't Good)" w. Paul Francis Webster m. Duke Ellington
 "I Guess I'll Have To Dream The Rest" w. Mickey Stoner & Martin Block m. Harold Green
 "I Know Why (And So Do You)" w. Mack Gordon m. Harry Warren
 "I Remember You" w. Johnny Mercer m. Victor Schertzinger
 "I Said No!" w. Frank Loesser m. Jule Styne
 "I See A Million People" w. Robert Sour m. Una Mae Carlisle
 "I, Yi, Yi, Yi, Yi" w. Mack Gordon m. Harry Warren
 "I'll Remember April" w. Don Raye & Patricia Johnston m. Gene De Paul
 "I'm Glad There Is You" w.m. Jimmy Dorsey & Paul Madeira Mertz
 "Introduction to a Waltz" m. Glenn Miller, Jerry Gray & Hal Dickinson
 "It Happened In Sun Valley" w. Mack Gordon m. Harry Warren
 "It's So Peaceful In The Country" w.m. Alec Wilder
 "I Understand" w. Kim Gannon m. Mabel Wayne
 "I've Got Sixpence" w.m. Elton Box & Desmond Cox
 "Jenny" (aka "The Saga of Jenny") w. Ira Gershwin m. Kurt Weill. Introduced by Gertrude Lawrence in the musical Lady in the Dark. Performed in the 1944 film version by Ginger Rogers
 "Jersey Bounce" m. Bobby Plater, Tiny Bradshaw, Edward Johnson & Robert B. Wright
 "Jim" w. Nelson Shawn m. Caesar Petrillo & Edward Ross
 "Kiss The Boys Goodbye" w. Frank Loesser m. Victor Schertzinger
 "Knock Me A Kiss" w.m. Mike Jackson
 "Let's All Meet At My House" w. Johnny Burke m. Jimmy Van Heusen
 "Let's Get Away from It All" w. Tom Adair m. Matt Dennis
 "Let's Not Talk About Love" w.m. Cole Porter
 "London Pride" w.m. Noël Coward
 "Ma! I Miss Your Apple Pie" w.m. Carmen Lombardo & John Jacob Loeb
 "Misirlou" w. (Eng) Milton Leeds, S. K. Russell & Fred Wise m. N. Roubanis
 "Moonlight Cocktail" w. Kim Gannon m. C. Luckeyth "Lucky" Roberts
 "My Adobe Hacienda" w.m. Louise Massey & Lee Penny
 "My Ship" w. Ira Gershwin m. Kurt Weill
 "My Sister and I" w.m. Hy Zaret, Joan Whitney & Alex Kramer
 "Oh! Look at Me Now" w. John DeVries m. Joe Bushkin
 "Please Take A Letter Miss Brown" Paul Cunningham, Ernie Burnett
 "Racing With The Moon" w. Vaughn Monroe & Pauline Pope m. Johnny Watson
 "Rancho Pillow" Charles Newman & Allie Wrubel
 "Remember Pearl Harbor" w.m. Don Reid & Sammy Kaye
 "Road To Zanzibar" w. Johnny Burke m. Jimmy Van Heusen from the film Road To Zanzibar
 "Rose O'Day" w.m. Charles Tobias & Al Lewis
 "Sand In My Shoes" w. Frank Loesser m. Victor Schertzinger
 "The Shrine Of Saint Cecilia" w. Carroll Loveday m. Nils Perne (Jokern)
 "A Sinner Kissed An Angel" w. Mack David m. Larry Shayne
 "Someone's Rocking My Dreamboat" w.m. Leon René, Otis René & Emerson Scott
 "So Near and Yet So Far" w.m. Cole Porter. Introduced by Fred Astaire in the film You'll Never Get Rich.
 "Starlight Serenade" w.m. Sonny Miller, Frederick Tysh & Hans May
 "The Story Of A Starry Night" w.m. Jerry Livingston, Al Hoffman & Mann Curtis
 "A String Of Pearls" w. Eddie De Lange m. Jerry Gray
 "Sun Valley Jump" m. Jerry Gray from the film Sun Valley Serenade
 "Take The "A" Train" w.m. Billy Strayhorn
 "Tangerine" w. Johnny Mercer m. Victor Schertzinger
 "Tenement Symphony" w. Sid Kuller & Ray Golden m. Hal Borne
 "That Lovely Weekend" w.m. Ted Heath & Moira Heath
 "There Goes That Song Again" Allie Wrubel
 "There, I've Said It Again" w.m. Redd Evans & Dave Mann
 "This Is New" w. Ira Gershwin m. Kurt Weill
 "This Time the Dream's on Me" w. Johnny Mercer m. Harold Arlen. Introduced by Priscilla Lane in the film Blues in the Night.
 "(Lights Out) 'Til Reveille" w. Stanley Cowan m. Stanley Cowan & Bobby Worth
 "Tonight We Love" w. Bobby Worth m. Freddy Martin & Ray Austin
 "Tschaikovsky (And Other Russians)" w. Ira Gershwin m. Kurt Weill. Introduced by Danny Kaye in the musical Lady in the Dark
 "Two In Love" w.m. Meredith Willson
 "Violets For Your Furs" w. Tom Adair m. Matt Dennis
 "The Waiter And The Porter And The Upstairs Maid" w.m Johnny Mercer
 "Walking the Floor Over You" w.m. Ernest Tubb
 "We're The Couple In The Castle" w. Frank Loesser m. Hoagy Carmichael
 "When I Love I Love" w. Mack Gordon m. Harry Warren
 "When I See an Elephant Fly" w. Ned Washington m. Oliver Wallace
 "When My Blue Moon Turns To Gold Again" w.m. Wiley Walker & Gene Sullivan
 "When They Sound The Last All Clear" w.m. Hughie Charles, Louis Elton
 "(There'll Be Bluebirds Over) The White Cliffs of Dover" w. Nat Burton m. Walter Kent
 "Why Don't We Do This More Often?" w. Charles Newman m. Allie Wrubel
 "Winter Weather" w.m. Ted Shapiro
 "You And I" w.m. Meredith Willson
 "You Don't Know What Love Is" w. Don Raye m. Gene De Paul

Other publications
Robert van Gulik – The Lore of the Chinese Lute: An Essay in Ch'in Ideology

Classical music

Premieres

Compositions
Joseph Achron – Concerto for Piano Solo
Richard Addinsell – Warsaw Concerto
Hanns Eisler – Vierzehn Arten den Regen zu Beschreiben (Fourteen Ways of Describing the Rain)
Roberto Gerhard – Sinfonía homenaje a Pedrell 
Reinhold Glière – Pochodnyj marš (Field march) for wind orchestra, op. 76
Paul Hindemith – English Horn Sonata (premiered November 23 in New York City)
Vagn Holmboe – Symphony No. 3, Sinfonia rustica
Symphony No. 4, Sinfonia sacra
Wilhelm Kienzl – String Quartet No.3, Op.113
Olivier Messiaen – Quatour pour la fin du temps
Harry Partch – Barstow
Sergei Prokofiev – String Quartet No. 2 in F, Op. 92
Sergei Rachmaninoff – Lullaby (Paraphrase of Tchaikovsky's "Cradle Song" Op. 16 No. 1)
Dmitri Shostakovich – Symphony No. 7 C major, Op. 60 "Leningrad"
Lukas Foss – Concerto No. 1 for clarinet and orchestra

Opera
Benjamin Britten – Paul Bunyan
Miguel Bernal Jiménez – Tata Vasco
William Grant Still – A Bayou Legend, with libretto by Verna Arvey

Film
Bernard Herrmann – Citizen Kane
Bernard Herrmann – The Devil and Daniel Webster
Erich Korngold – The Sea Wolf
Ralph Vaughan Williams – 49th Parallel

Jazz

Musical theatre 
 Apple Sauce London revue opened at the Palladium on March 5
 Banjo Eyes Broadway production opened on December 25 at the Hollywood Theatre and ran for 126 performances.
 Best Foot Forward Broadway production opened on October 1 at the Ethel Barrymore Theatre and ran for 326 performances.
 Get a Load of This London production opened on November 19 at the Hippodrome Theatre and ran for 698 performances.
 High Kickers Broadway production opened on October 31 at the Broadhurst Theatre and ran for 171 performances.
 It Happens on Ice Broadway Revue opened on July 15 at the Center Theatre and ran for 386 performances.
 Lady Behave London production opened at His Majesty's Theatre on July 24 and ran for 401 performances
 Lady in the Dark Broadway production opened on January 23 at the Alvin Theatre and ran for 467 performances.
 Let's Face It! Broadway production opened on October 29 at the Imperial Theatre and ran for 547 performances.
 Sons O' Fun Broadway Revue opened on December 1 at the Winter Garden Theatre and ran for 742 performances.

Musical films 
 Alle gaar rundt og forelsker sig, starring Lilian Ellis
 Apavadu
 Babes on Broadway
 Birth of the Blues
 Blues in the Night
 The Chocolate Soldier
 Dumbo
 Háry János, starring Antal Páger and Margit Dajka
 He Found a Star starring Vic Oliver, Sarah Churchill and Evelyn Dall
 Hold That Ghost starring Bud Abbott and Lou Costello and featuring The Andrews Sisters and Ted Lewis and his Band
 In the Navy starring Bud Abbott, Lou Costello, Dick Powell and The Andrews Sisters
 Kiss the Boys Goodbye starring Don Ameche and Mary Martin
 Lady Be Good
 Moon Over Miami
 Navy Blues starring Ann Sheridan, Jack Oakie, Martha Raye and Jack Haley
 Playmates
 Rise and Shine starring Jack Oakie, Linda Darnell, George Murphy and Milton Berle
 Road to Zanzibar
 San Antonio Rose starring Robert Paige, Jane Frazee, Eve Arden and The Merry Macs
 Sis Hopkins starring Judy Canova, Bob Crosby, Jerry Colonna and Susan Hayward
 Smilin' Through
 Sun Valley Serenade
 Sunny
 Sweetheart of the Campus
 That Certain Something
 That Night in Rio
 They Met in Argentina
 Time Out for Rhythm
 Too Many Blondes starring Rudy Vallee and Helen Parrish
 Week-End in Havana
 You'll Never Get Rich starring Fred Astaire, Rita Hayworth and Robert Benchley. Directed by Sidney Lanfield.
 You're the One starring Bonnie Baker, Orrin Tucker & his Orchestra, Edward Everett Horton and Jerry Colonna
 Ziegfeld Girl
 Zis Boom Bah starring Grace Hayes, Peter Lind Hayes, Mary Healy, Skeets Gallagher and Benny Rubin, and directed by William Nigh

Births
January 3 – Van Dyke Parks, singer, arranger and composer
January 9
Joan Baez, folk singer
Roy Head, singer-songwriter and guitarist (died 2020)
January 11 – Dave Edwards, American musician (died 2000)
January 12 – Long John Baldry, R&B singer (Blues Incorporated) (died 2005)
January 15 – Captain Beefheart, musician and artist (died 2010)
January 18 – David Ruffin (The Temptations) (died 1991)
January 20 – Ron Townson, The 5th Dimension (died 2001)
January 21
Plácido Domingo, operatic tenor
Richie Havens, folk singer (died 2013)
January 24
Michael Chapman, folk guitarist and singer-songwriter (died 2021)
Neil Diamond, singer-songwriter
Aaron Neville, R&B and soul vocalist and musician (The Neville Brothers)
 January 27 – Bobby Hutcherson, African-American jazz musician (died 2016)
January 28 – Cash McCall, American singer-songwriter and guitarist (died 2010)
February 4 – John Steel, rock drummer The Animals
February 5
Henson Cargill, country singer (died 2007)
Barrett Strong, Motown singer-songwriter (died 2023)
Cory Wells, rock singer (Three Dog Night) (died 2015)
February 6 – Dave Berry, singer (Dave Berry and the Crusaders)
February 11
Earl Lewis (The Channels)
Sergio Mendes, Latin American musician
Tom Rush, folk & blues singer
February 12 – Dominguinhos, Brazilian composer, accordionist and singer (died 2013)
February 15 – Brian Holland, songwriter
February 17 – Gene Pitney, pop singer-songwriter (died 2006)
February 18
Herman Santiago, rock & roll singer-songwriter (Frankie Lymon & The Teenagers)
Irma Thomas, soul singer
February 20 – Buffy Sainte-Marie, singer and composer
February 24 – Joanie Sommers, singer and actress
March 6 – Palle Mikkelborg, jazz trumpeter and composer
March 8 – Ivana Loudová, composer (died 2017)
March 12 – Paul Kantner, psychedelic rock guitarist (Jefferson Airplane, KBC Band) (died 2016)
March 15 – Mike Love, rock singer (The Beach Boys)
March 18 – Wilson Pickett, soul singer (died 2006)
March 22 – Jeremy Clyde, singer (Chad and Jeremy)
March 24 – Michael Masser, songwriter, composer and producer of popular music (died 2015)
March 28 – Alf Clausen, orchestra conductor (The Simpsons)
March 30 – Graeme Edge (The Moody Blues) (died 2021)
April 3
 Jan Berry, American singer (Jan & Dean) (died 2004)
 Jorma Hynninen, Finnish baritone
 Philippé Wynne, American musician (died 1984)
April 5
David LaFlamme, born Gary Posie, classical and rock violinist (It's a Beautiful Day)
Dave Swarbrick, folk rock fiddle player (Fairport Convention) (died 2016)
April 8 – J. J. Jackson (died 2004)
April 9 – Kay Adams, country singer
April 17 – Adolphus Hailstork, composer and educator
April 19 – Roberto Carlos, singer
April 21 – Jim Owen, country singer-songwriter (died 2020)
April 28
Peter Anders, The Tradewinds
Ann-Margret, actress and singer
April 30 – Johnny Farina (Santo & Johnny)
May 4 – Richard Burns (The Hondells)
May 8 – John Fred, vocalist (John Fred & His Playboy Band) (died 2005)
May 9
Peter Birrell (Freddie & The Dreamers)
Danny Rapp, American singer (Danny and the Juniors) (died 1983)
May 11 – Eric Burdon, R&B singer (The Animals)
May 13
Joe Brown, singer and guitarist
Ritchie Valens, singer (died 1959)
May 18 – Lobby Loyde, Australian guitarist, songwriter and producer (Billy Thorpe & the Aztecs, Purple Hearts, Wild Cherries and Rose Tattoo) (died 2007)
May 21 – Ronald Isley (The Isley Brothers)
May 24
Konrad Boehmer, composer
Bob Dylan, folk singer-songwriter
May 27 – Teppo Hauta-aho, Finnish double bassist and composer
June 1 – Edo de Waart, conductor
June 2
William Guest, R&B/soul singer (Gladys Knight & the Pips)
Charlie Watts, rock drummer (The Rolling Stones) (died 2021)
June 5 – Martha Argerich, pianist
June 7 – Jaime Laredo, Bolivian-American violinist and conductor
June 8 – Fuzzy Haskins, musician
June 9 – Jon Lord, rock keyboard player and composer (Deep Purple) (died 2012)
June 10
Mickey Jones, rock drummer and character actor (died 2018)
Shirley Owens, soul singer (The Shirelles)
Aida Vedishcheva, Soviet and Russian singer
June 12
Chick Corea, jazz musician (died 2021)
Roy Harper, folk rock singer-songwriter
Reg Presley, rock singer-songwriter (The Troggs) (died 2013)
June 13 – Esther Ofarim, singer
June 15 – Harry Nilsson, singer-songwriter (died 1994)
June 16 – Lamont Dozier, songwriter (died 2022)
June 23 – Robert Hunter, American singer-songwriter and guitarist (The Grateful Dead)
June 24 – Erkin Koray, Turkish musician
July 5 – Terry Cashman, record producer and singer-songwriter
July 7 – Jim Rodford, bass guitarist (Argent) (died 2018)
July 16 – Desmond Dekker, reggae musician (died 2006)
July 17
Spencer Davis, instrumentalist (The Spencer Davis Group) (died 2020)
Gribouille, singer (died 1968)
July 18
Lonnie Mack, rock and blues guitarist (died 2016)
Martha Reeves, vocalist
July 19 – Vicki Carr, singer
July 22
 Estelle Bennett (The Ronettes) (died 2009)
 George Clinton, American musician
July 25 – Manny Charlton (Nazareth) (died 2022)
July 26 – Brenton Wood, singer-songwriter
July 27 – Johannes Fritsch, composer and violist (died 2010)
July 28 – Riccardo Muti, conductor
July 30 – Paul Anka, singer-songwriter
August 2 – Doris Coley (The Shirelles) (died 2000)
August 3 – Beverly Lee (The Shirelles)
August 4 – Timi Yuro, soul singer (died 2004)
August 14
David Crosby, rock singer-songwriter (The Byrds, Crosby, Stills & Nash) (died 2023)
Connie Smith, country singer-songwriter
August 19 – Alain Boublil, librettist
August 20 – Dave Brock (Hawkwind)
August 21
Tom Coster (Santana)
Jackie DeShannon, singer-songwriter
August 22 – Marvell Thomas, African-American Memphis blues keyboardist (died 2017)
August 24 – Kenny Rogers, country musician (died 2020)
August 26 – Chris Curtis (The Searchers) (died 2005)
August 27 – Cesária Évora, morna vocalist (died 2011)
August 28 – Joseph Shabalala, choral director (Ladysmith Black Mambazo) (died 2020)
August 30 – John McNally (The Searchers)
September 9 – Otis Redding, soul singer (died 1967)
September 10 – Christopher Hogwood, conductor and harpsichordist (died 2014)
September 13 – David Clayton-Thomas, vocalist (Blood, Sweat & Tears)
September 14 – Alberto Naranjo, arranger and composer (died 2020)
September 19 – Cass Elliot, singer (died 1974)
September 24 – Linda McCartney (Wings) (died 1998)
September 26 – Salvatore Accardo, Italian violinist and conductor
October 2 – Ron Meagher (The Beau Brummels)
October 3 – Chubby Checker, singer
October 4 – Mighty Shadow, Trinidadian calypsonian (died 2018)
October 13 – Paul Simon, singer-songwriter
October 17
Alan Howard (The Tremeloes)
James Seals (Seals and Crofts) (died 2022)
October 21
Manfred Lubowitz (Manfred Mann)
Steve Cropper, Booker T. & the M.G.'s
October 24 – Helen Reddy, singer (died 2020)
October 28
Curtis Lee, singer (died 2015)
Hank Marvin, guitarist (The Shadows)
October 30 – Otis Williams, vocalist (The Temptations)
November 2
Brian Poole, singer (The Tremeloes)
Bruce Welch, guitarist and singer (The Shadows)
November 5 – Art Garfunkel, singer
November 6 – Doug Sahm (Sir Douglas Quintet) (died 1999)
November 8 – Simon Standage, baroque violinist
November 9 – Tom Fogerty, rock rhythm guitarist (Creedence Clearwater Revival) (died 1990)
November 13 – Odia Coates, singer (died 1991)
November 16 – Dan Penn, American singer-songwriter and producer
November 20 – Dr. John, American singer-songwriter and musician (died 2019)
November 21 – David Porter, American soul musician
November 24
Pete Best, rock drummer (The Beatles, original lineup)
Donald "Duck" Dunn, rock bass guitarist (Booker T. & the M.G.'s, The Blues Brothers) (died 2012)
November 27 – Eddie Rabbitt, country singer-songwriter (Amos Garrett) (died 1998)
November 29 – Denny Doherty, folk singer (The Mamas & the Papas) (died 2007)
December 2 – Tom McGuinness, English pop guitarist (Manfred Mann)
December 8 - Bobby Elliott, drummer (The Hollies)
December 10
Kyu Sakamoto, Japanese singer and actor (died 1985)
Peter Sarstedt, Indian-born British singer-songwriter (died 2017)
Chad Stuart, English folk rock singer (Chad & Jeremy) (died 2020)
December 12 – Tim Hauser, American singer (The Manhattan Transfer) (died 2014)
December 18 – Sam Andrew, American rock musician (Big Brother & The Holding Company) (died 2015)
December 19 – Maurice White, American R&B musician (Earth, Wind and Fire) (died 2016)
December 27
Les Maguire, English pop pianist (Gerry & the Pacemakers)
Mike Pinder, English rock keyboard player (The Moody Blues)
December 29 – Ray Thomas, English rock flautist and singer-songwriter (The Moody Blues) (died 2018)

Deaths
January 7 – Louis Bousquet, composer and lyricist (born 1871)
January 10 – Frank Bridge, composer, 61
January 23 – Dobri Hristov, composer, 65
February 5 – Miina Härma, Estonian organist, composer, and conductor, 76
February 13 – Blind Boy Fuller, blues musician
February 15 – Guido Adler, musicologist
February 19 – Sir Hamilton Harty, conductor and composer, 61
February 21 – La Bolduc, Québécois singer, 46 (cancer)
March 11 – Sir Henry Walford Davies, composer, 71
March 12 – Ernst Décsey, music critic, 70
March 17 – Wassily Sapellnikoff, pianist
March 20 – Oskar Baum, music teacher and writer
March 27 – Primo Riccitelli, Italian composer, 65
April 6 – Henry Burr, popular singer
April 17 – Al Bowlly, popular singer
April 19 – Johanna Müller-Hermann, Austrian composer and teacher
April 21 – Agustín Bardi, tango composer, pianist and violinist, 56 (heart attack)
May 1
Julia Claussen, operatic mezzo-soprano
Howard Johnson, lyricist
May 18 – Milka Ternina, Croatian dramatic soprano
May 23 – Slavko Osterc, Slovenian composer
May 30 – Edmund L. Gruber, composer (born 1879)
June 17 – Johan Wagenaar, organist and composer, 78
June 29 – Ignacy Jan Paderewski, pianist and composer, former Prime Minister of Poland, 80
July 5 – Oskar Fried, conductor and composer
July 8 – Philippe Gaubert, composer and conductor, 62
July 10 – Jelly Roll Morton, jazz pianist, 55 (asthma)
July 30 – Hugo Becker, cellist, 78
August 16 – John Coates, operatic tenor
August 30 – Hong Nan-pa, composer, violinist, conductor, music critic and educator, 44
September 18 – Louis Feuillard, French cellist and professor (born 1872)
September 19 – Enrique Saborido, tango pianist and composer, 64
October 3 – Wilhelm Kienzl, Austrian composer and conductor (born 1857)
October 8
Helen Morgan, US singer and actress, 41 (cirrhosis of the liver)
Gus Kahn, US lyric writer, 54
October 26 – Victor Schertzinger, violinist and composer, 53 (heart attack)
October 29 – Edmée Favart, operatic soprano, 62
October 30 – Leon "Chu" Berry, jazz saxophonist, 33 (car accident)
November 1 – Félix Mayol, singer, 68
November 16 – Miina Härma, organist and composer, 77
November 17 – Edmond Haraucourt, lyricist (born 1856)
November 25 – Henri Christiné, composer,
November 29 – Gennaro Papi, Italian opera conductor, 54
December 3 – Christian Sinding, composer, 85
December 21 – Peetie Wheatstraw, blues singer, 39 (car accident)
December 22 – Jurgis Karnavičius, composer, 57
December 24 – Siegfried Alkan, composer, 83
date unknown – William H. Potstock, music teacher and composer

References

 
20th century in music
Music by year